Norman Suckling (14 January 1938 – 10 October 1964) was a New Zealand rower who won a bronze medal representing his country at the 1958 British Empire and Commonwealth Games

Biography
Born in Cambridge on 14 January 1938, Suckling was the son of Dorothy Maud Suckling (née Cox) and Phillip Willway Suckling. He took up rowing at the age of 16, joining the Cambridge Rowing Club.

Suckling competed at 1958 British Empire and Commonwealth Games in the men's double scull, partnering James Hill to win the bronze medal, and becoming the first Cambridge athlete to represent New Zealand at an Empire or Commonwealth games.

Suckling died on 10 October 1964, after suffering a heart attack while mowing the lawn, and was buried at Hamilton Park Cemetery. He was survived by his wife, Jennry, and their two children.

References

External links
 

1938 births
1964 deaths
Sportspeople from Cambridge, New Zealand
New Zealand male rowers
Rowers at the 1958 British Empire and Commonwealth Games
Commonwealth Games bronze medallists for New Zealand
Commonwealth Games medallists in rowing
Burials at Hamilton Park Cemetery
Medallists at the 1958 British Empire and Commonwealth Games